The word "eradication" is derived from Latin word "radix" which means "root". It may refer to:
Eradication of infectious diseases, the reduction of the global incidence of an infectious disease in its host population to zero
Extirpation, or intentional local extinction, of an introduced species
Genocide, the deliberate, systematic destruction of an ethnic, religious or national group of people
Intentional extermination of a population of insects or vermin as part of pest control
A heraldic term denoting a tree that has been uprooted; see eradication (heraldry)
Total removal of a given pathogen from an individual (medical or clinical use), also known as clearance of an infection, particularly in the context of HIV
A song on the album The Price of Existence performed by the death metal band All Shall Perish
"Eradicate the Doubt", a song by Biffy Clyro

See also
 Extirpation

pl:Eradykacja